Political parties in Bougainville lists political parties in the Autonomous Region of Bougainville, an autonomous region within Papua New Guinea. The  following political parties operate only within Bougainville.

Parties active only in Bougainville
Bougainville Independence Movement
Bougainville Labour Party
Bougainville People's Congress
New Bougainville Party
Bougainville Islands Unity Party

See also
List of political parties in Papua New Guinea
Lists of political parties

Bougainville